Rahul Dev (born 27 September 1968) is an Indian actor and former model who predominantly works in Hindi, Telugu, Tamil, Kannada, and Malayalam language films and few Marathi, Bengali, Bhojpuri, Gujarati, Punjabi and Odia flims.

Early life 
Rahul Dev and his brother Mukul Dev both are sons of Hari Dev who was an Assistant Commissioner of Police.

Career 
He made his screen debut in the 2000 film Champion where he played a villainous role for which he was nominated for the 2001 Filmfare Best Villain Award. He also appeared as a villain in the Punjabi movie Dharti in 2011. He then moved into Malayalam cinema, playing the role of an assassin Sheik Imran in Amal Neerad's Sagar Alias Jacky Reloaded. Four years later, he made a comeback with Sringaravelan.

In December 2013, Dev made his television debut, playing the role of the demon Arunasur in the mythological TV series Devon Ke Dev...Mahadev. He Participated in Bigg Boss (Hindi season 10) and Evicted in Day 63. He appeared in Bhojpuri film Dulhan Chahi Pakistan Se 2 in 2018. Rahul will soon be seen sharing screen space with Aftab in the upcoming crime thriller web series Poison 2.

Personal life 

Dev's wife Rina died of cancer on 16 May 2009. The couple had been married for 11 years and have a son, Sidhart. Dev has spoken about the experience of being a single father. He is in a relationship with model and actress Mugdha Godse.

On 22 April 2019, his father, Hari Dev, who was an assistant commissioner of police died at the age of 91.

Filmography

Film

Television

Web series

Awards and nominations

References

External links

 
 

Living people
Indian male film actors
Indian male models
Punjabi people
Male actors from New Delhi
Male actors in Telugu cinema
Male actors in Punjabi cinema
Male actors in Hindi cinema
Zee Cine Awards winners
20th-century Indian male actors
21st-century Indian male actors
Male actors in Malayalam cinema
Male actors in Bhojpuri cinema
Male actors in Tamil cinema
Male actors in Kannada cinema
1968 births
Indian Sikhs
Fear Factor: Khatron Ke Khiladi participants
Bigg Boss (Hindi TV series) contestants
International Indian Film Academy Awards winners